A Massive Swelling: Celebrity Reexamined as a Grotesque, Crippling Disease and Other Cultural Revelations is the first book written by Cintra Wilson. The book consists of a collection of essays which focus on America's obsession with celebrity culture and how, according to Wilson, celebrity status and the desire to attain it, is a "grotesque crippling disease" that affects nearly every American who participates in and reacts to the mass media. Celebrities from Celine Dion to English post-punk front man from The Fall, Mark E. Smith, are examined as victims of a larger, imaginary machine that uses artists for a period of time, and then discards them once they become unprofitable. In her book, Wilson focuses a good deal of attention to the influence that New York City and Los Angeles play on people and their appetite for fame as well as the media's ability to manipulate consumers into believing that celebrities are somehow more physically equipped for success and that what is aggressively sought after and the envy of so many people is nothing more than a facade.

Essay collections
2000 non-fiction books
Viking Press books